Bernhard Fleischmann, born 1975 in Vienna, is an Austrian musician, usually known as B. Fleischmann.

Fleischmann started his musical life as a drummer, although he is better known for electronic music. He has released several albums on Morr Music and other labels.

Discography

Solo albums
 Pop Loops for Breakfast (1999)
 Sidonie (1999)
 A Choir of Empty Beds (2000)
 TMP (2001)
 Welcome Tourist (2003)
 The Humbucking Coil (2006)
 Melancholie (2007)
 Angst is not a Weltanschauung (2008)
 I'm Not Ready for the Grave Yet (November 2012)
 Stop Making Fans (February 2018)
 Music for Shared Rooms (2022)

Groups and collaborations

 Duo 505 (Fleischmann & Weixelbaum), Late (2004)
 The Year Of, Slow Days (2006)
 Duo 505 (Fleischmann & Weixelbaum), Another Illusion (2008)
 Duo 505 (Fleischmann & Weixelbaum), Walzer Oder Nicht (2011)

References

External links

 

1975 births
Living people
Austrian electronic musicians
Morr Music artists